Aptekarsky Ostrov Municipal Okrug is a municipal okrug in Petrogradsky District, one of the eighty-one low-level municipal divisions  of the federal city of St. Petersburg, Russia. As of the 2010 Census, its population was 20,575, up from 19,277 recorded during the 2002 Census.

References

Notes

Sources

Petrogradsky District